The Pinwheel Galaxy (also known as Messier 101, M101 or NGC 5457) is a face-on spiral galaxy  away from Earth in the constellation Ursa Major. It was discovered by Pierre Méchain in 1781 and was communicated that year to Charles Messier, who verified its position for inclusion in the Messier Catalogue as one of its final entries.

On February 28, 2006, NASA and the European Space Agency released a very detailed image of the Pinwheel Galaxy, which was the largest and most-detailed image of a galaxy by Hubble Space Telescope at the time. The image was composed of 51 individual exposures, plus some extra ground-based photos.

On August 24, 2011, a Type Ia supernova, SN 2011fe, was discovered in M101.

Discovery 
Pierre Méchain, the discoverer of the galaxy, described it as a "nebula without star, very obscure and pretty large, 6' to 7' in diameter, between the left hand of Bootes and the tail of the great Bear. It is difficult to distinguish when one lits the [grating] wires."

William Herschel wrote in 1784 that the galaxy was one of several which "...in my 7-, 10-, and 20-feet [focal length] reflectors shewed a mottled kind of nebulosity, which I shall call resolvable; so that I expect my present telescope will, perhaps, render the stars visible of which I suppose them to be composed."

Lord Rosse observed the galaxy in his 72-inch-diameter Newtonian reflector during the second half of the 19th century. He was the first to make extensive note of the spiral structure and made several sketches.

To observe the spiral structure in modern instruments requires a fairly large instrument, very dark skies, and a low-power eyepiece.

Structure and composition 

M101 is a large galaxy, with a diameter of 170,000 light-years. By comparison, the Milky Way has a diameter of between 100,000 and 120,000 light-years. It has around a trillion stars. It has a disk mass on the order of 100 billion solar masses, along with a small central bulge of about 3 billion solar masses. Its characteristics can be compared to those of Andromeda Galaxy.

M101 has a high population of H II regions, many of which are very large and bright. H II regions usually accompany the enormous clouds of high density molecular hydrogen gas contracting under their own gravitational force where stars form. H II regions are ionized by large numbers of extremely bright and hot young stars; those in M101 are capable of creating hot superbubbles. In a 1990 study, 1,264 H II regions were cataloged in the galaxy. Three are prominent enough to receive New General Catalogue numbers—NGC 5461, NGC 5462, and NGC 5471.

M101 is asymmetrical due to the tidal forces from interactions with its companion galaxies. These gravitational interactions compress interstellar hydrogen gas, which then triggers strong star formation activity in M101's spiral arms that can be detected in ultraviolet images.

In 2001, the X-ray source P98, located in M101, was identified as an ultra-luminous X-ray source—a source more powerful than any single star but less powerful than a whole galaxy—using the Chandra X-ray Observatory. It received the designation M101 ULX-1. In 2005, Hubble and XMM-Newton observations showed the presence of an optical counterpart, strongly indicating that M101 ULX-1 is an X-ray binary. Further observations showed that the system deviated from expected models—the black hole is just 20 to 30 solar masses, and consumes material (including captured stellar wind) at a higher rate than theory suggests.

It is estimated that M101 has about 150 globular clusters, the same as the number of the Milky Way's globular clusters.

Companion galaxies 
M101 has six prominent companion galaxies: NGC 5204, NGC 5474, NGC 5477, NGC 5585, UGC 8837 and UGC 9405. As stated above, the gravitational interaction between it and its satellites may have spawned its grand design pattern. The galaxy has probably distorted the second-listed companion. The list comprises most or all of the M101 Group.

Supernovae and luminous red nova

Four internal supernovae have been recorded:
SN 1909A, was discovered by Max Wolf in January 1909 and reached magnitude 12.1. 
SN 1951H reached magnitude 17.5 in September 1951.
SN 1970G reached magnitude 11.5 in January 1970.
On August 24, 2011, a Type Ia supernova, SN 2011fe, initially designated PTF 11kly, was discovered in M101. It had visual magnitude 17.2 at discovery and reached 9.9 at its peak. 

On February 10, 2015, a luminous red nova, known as M101 OT2015-1 was discovered in the Pinwheel Galaxy.

See also
 List of Messier objects

  – a similar face-on spiral galaxy
  – a similar face-on spiral galaxy that is sometimes called the Southern Pinwheel Galaxy
  – a similar face-on spiral galaxy
  – another galaxy sometimes called the Pinwheel Galaxy

References

External links 

 SEDS: Spiral Galaxy M101
 
 
 
 
 

Intermediate spiral galaxies
M101 Group
Ursa Major (constellation)
Messier objects
NGC objects
08981
50063
026
Astronomical objects discovered in 1781
Discoveries by Pierre Méchain